The 1968 Tampa Spartans football team represented the University of Tampa in the 1968 NCAA College Division football season. It was the Spartans' 32nd season. The team was led by head coach Fran Curci, in his first year, and played their home games at Tampa Stadium in Tampa, Florida. They finished with a record of seven wins and three losses (7–3). Curci was officially hired as the replacement for Sam Bailey as head coach on January 25, 1968, from the Miami Hurricanes, and he won his first game as head coach on the road against UC Santa Barbara. Other games of note during the season included upsets at Tulane and over Mississippi State, both of the NCAA University Division.

Schedule

References

Tampa
Tampa Spartans football seasons
Tampa Spartans football